László Kamuti (13 January 1940 – 27 August 2020) was a Hungarian foil fencer. He competed at four Olympic Games.

References

External links
 

1940 births
2020 deaths
Hungarian male foil fencers
Olympic fencers of Hungary
Fencers at the 1960 Summer Olympics
Fencers at the 1964 Summer Olympics
Fencers at the 1968 Summer Olympics
Fencers at the 1972 Summer Olympics
Fencers from Budapest